Gymnopilus pallidus is a species of mushroom in the family Hymenogastraceae.

See also

List of Gymnopilus species

pallidus
Fungi of North America
Taxa named by William Alphonso Murrill